The Great Western Railway (GWR) 3100 Class was a class of 2-6-2T side tank steam locomotive.

History 
This class of large prairie was created in 1938  when Collett rebuilt some of Churchward's  3150 Class with a view to using them as bankers, particularly from Severn Tunnel Junction shed. Only five engines were ever modified, namely 3173, 3156, 3181, 3155 and 3179 which were rebuilt as 3100 to 3104 respectively. None of these were preserved.

See also
GWR 3100/5100 Class (1906)
GWR 3150 Class
GWR 5101 Class
GWR 6100 Class
GWR 8100 Class
List of GWR standard classes with two outside cylinders

References

External links  
Class 3100 Details at Rail UK

2-6-2T locomotives
3100
Railway locomotives introduced in 1938
Scrapped locomotives
Standard gauge steam locomotives of Great Britain